Zhao Fei (born 1961) is a Chinese cinematographer and frequent collaborator to many directors of the China's so called "fifth generation" film movement. Zhao also served as Woody Allen's director of photography for three films between 1998 and 2001.

Biography
Born in 1961 in Xi'an, Shaanxi province, Zhao was the son of an architect. Growing up during the turbulent years of the Cultural Revolution, Zhao began his career in film when he applied to the newly reopened Beijing Film Academy in 1978. Zhao would study cinematography and graduate in 1982 with others of the so-called "fifth generation" including directors Chen Kaige, Zhang Yimou, and Tian Zhuangzhuang.

Working throughout the 1980s, Zhao would act as the director of photography ("DOP") for Tian Zhuangzhuang's The Horse Thief, Huang Jianxin's Samsara, and others. In 1991, Zhao worked with director Zhang Yimou on his magnum opus, Raise the Red Lantern. For Zhao, the production of Raise the Red Lantern was a major turning point, allowing him to synthesize his previous experiences with painting and art and his current responsibilities as a cinematographer.

By the late 1990s, Zhao had built up an impressive resume, but little would prepare him for the working with Chen Kaige on his historical epic The Emperor and the Assassin. Chen specifically asked for Zhao to work as the DOP for the project, realizing that the ambitious scope of the film would need someone who was disciplined but resourceful. Zhao's work on The Emperor and the Assassin would take up months and then years, and required Zhao to research historical castles, fortifications, and the minutiae of China's Warring States period. The actual production was equally intense, as Zhao would often have to create makeshift dollies and other contraptions to capture shots.

By this point, Zhao's work in China had caught the eye of international filmmakers, and Zhao would serve as the DOP for three of American director Woody Allen's films, beginning with Sweet and Lowdown. Allen had first noticed Zhao's work from Raise the Red Lantern, though Zhao claims that he is unsure why Allen selected him. The production on Sweet and Lowdown was difficult at times, given Zhao's lack of English-speaking abilities and the difficulties of keeping a translator on set at all times. But both Zhao and Allen walked away from the experience pleased with the collaboration, and Zhao would work with Allen on two more films. Allen, himself, praised the Chinese cinematographer, comparing Zhao favorably with Allen's past DOPs, including Carlo Di Palma, Gordon Willis, and Sven Nykvist.

Filmography

References

External links
 
 
 Zhao Fei at the Chinese Movie Database

Chinese cinematographers
Beijing Film Academy alumni
Artists from Xi'an
1961 births
Living people
Date of birth missing (living people)